Marcos Rivas Barrales (born November 25, 1947) is a Mexican former football midfielder. He played for the Mexico national team between 1970 and 1973. He was part of the Mexico squad for the 1970 World Cup.

External links
 
 

1947 births
Association football midfielders
Mexico international footballers
1970 FIFA World Cup players
Atlante F.C. footballers
Club León footballers
Liga MX players
Footballers from Mexico City
Living people
Mexican footballers